Summer Pasture is a 2010 documentary film by Lynn True, Nelson Walker and Tsering Perlo. The film follows a nomadic family living in Kham.

The film premiered at the 2010 Full Frame Documentary Film Festival, and had a theatrical premiere in Manhattan on August 15, 2011.

References

External links
Summer Pasture at khamfilmproject.org

Tibetan-language films
Films about Tibet